Ayga is a rural locality (a settlement) in Ilezskoye Rural Settlement, Tarnogsky District, Vologda Oblast, Russia. The population was 304 as of 2002. There are 5 streets.

Geography 
Ayga is located 31 km northeast of Tarnogsky Gorodok (the district's administrative centre) by road. Yelifanovskaya Vystavka is the nearest rural locality.

References 

Rural localities in Tarnogsky District